The Half-Way House is a former inn at 142 Broadway, West Ealing, London, England.

History
The inn was originally known as the Old Hat, and was one of two by that name locally. It may have been a stopping point for the mail coach route between London and Oxford. It is now the Diamond Hotel.

References 

Buildings and structures in the London Borough of Ealing
Pubs in the London Borough of Ealing
Defunct hotels in London
Former pubs in London